Diplomatic Siege is a 1999 American direct-to-video action thriller film directed by Gustavo Graef-Marino and starring Peter Weller, Daryl Hannah and Tom Berenger.

Cast
Peter Weller as Steve Mitchell
Daryl Hannah as Erica Long
Tom Berenger as Buck Swain
Adrian Pintea as Goran
Irina Movila as Petra
Uwe Ochsenknecht as Colonel Peter Vojnovic

Reception
John Ferguson of Radio Times awarded the film awarded the film two stars out of five and wrote that it has "an illogical plot and lame dialogue."

TV Guide gave a mixed review: "This far-fetched cold war thriller would've been more fun to watch had its creative personnel taken a more intentional tongue-in-cheek approach; as it is, the stars veer over the top whenever the action flags, but this comic attack seems less a desire to kid the material than an attempt to camouflage its weaknesses. Thanks to their chemistry together, Hannah and Weller's anti-extremist heroics compel attention far more than the Swain-versus-Goran contretemps. In fact, Berenger's scenes as Swain seem tacked-on for added marquee power, but far worse is the rickety script's unmasking of a truly preposterous surprise traitor."

References

External links